The 2017–18 SPHL season was the 14th season of the Southern Professional Hockey League (SPHL).

League business

Team changes
The Birmingham Bulls from Pelham, Alabama, join the SPHL as an expansion team on April 26, 2017.
The Columbus Cottonmouths suspended operations on May 3, 2017, because the franchise was unable to find a new owner in time for scheduling the 2017–18 season.
The Fayetteville FireAntz were sold and rebranded as the Fayetteville Marksmen.

Regular season

Standings
Final standings.

‡ William B. Coffey Trophy winners
 Advanced to playoffs

President's Cup playoffs
For 2018, the top eight teams at the end of the regular season qualified for the playoffs. The league implemented a new format so that the top three seeds chose their opponent from the bottom four qualifiers, calling it the "challenge round". The second round still had the highest versus lowest remaining seed format.

Playoff bracket

Finals
Home team is listed first.

Awards

All-SPHL selections

References

External links
Southern Professional Hockey League website

Southern Professional Hockey League seasons
Sphl